The 22nd TCA Awards were presented by the Television Critics Association. Mary Lynn Rajskub hosted the ceremony on July 23, 2006 at the Ritz-Carlton Huntington Hotel and Spa in Pasadena, California.

Winners and nominees

Multiple wins 
The following shows received multiple wins:

Multiple nominations 
The following shows received multiple nominations:

References

External links
Official website
2006 TCA Awards at IMDb.com

2006 television awards
2006 in American television
TCA Awards ceremonies